The Strand Station, also referred to as Auckland Strand Station, is a railway station located on the eastern edge of the Auckland CBD. It serves as the long-distance railway station for Auckland. It is the northern terminus of the Northern Explorer service between Auckland and Wellington, and the northern terminus for the Te Huia service on Saturdays from 24 July 2021. Suburban services are not scheduled to pass through the station, however, it serves as a backup for Britomart Transport Centre during times of disruption.

The platforms were formerly part of the Auckland Railway Station complex which was opened in 1930 on Beach Road, replacing the previous railway terminus which was on the Queen Street site where Britomart now stands. The 1930 station was the third to serve as the rail terminus for Auckland, and remained the sole station serving the CBD until its closure in July 2003, when Britomart became the new terminus. The original Platform 7 (now referred to as Platform 1) was retained for limited use as 'The Strand Station', named after the adjacent street. It continued to be used by a limited number of peak-hour suburban trains for a few months following the opening of Britomart. After this, the sole used platform served as a limited-use station for excursions and charters, though it and the other abandoned platforms fell into a state of disrepair. In August 2011, the original Platform 7 and Platform 6 (now referred to as Platform 2) were redeveloped and officially reopened for potential use during Rugby World Cup 2011, although they were never used for that purpose. These platforms were used for Northern Explorer services from December 2015 until December 2021.

History

Auckland Railway Station

Refurbishment

Between 2003 and 2011, the platforms had deteriorated into a decrepit state. All of the platforms had been shortened for the Britomart Curve, sections of removed track were stacked up on top of each other adjacent to the platforms, and grass and weeds covered most of the site.

In 2011, two platforms were upgraded by Auckland Transport to prepare them for use as an alternative to Britomart for the 2011 Rugby World Cup. In a $1.7 million project, the canopies were removed from two platforms, with a small section left behind for historic purposes, and the canopies on the other platforms were also left standing due to their heritage value. The platforms were resurfaced, and amenities such as lighting and a public address system were installed.
The platforms did not end up being used during the 2011 Rugby World Cup, but they continued to serve as a potential backup station for Britomart during disruptions.

During 2013, stabling facilities were constructed in the disused part of the station, to the north of the refurbished platforms. The stabling yard, officially called the Strand Distributed Stabling Facility, is designed to hold trains when they are not in service. In 2014, the station was fully electrified as part of Auckland's railway electrification project. In December 2015, the station became the terminus of Auckland's sole long-distance passenger train service, the Northern Explorer which ran between Auckland and Wellington, following the shift of its Auckland terminus from Britomart. As the Northern Explorer had become the only diesel service still using Britomart, its operator KiwiRail was requested by Auckland Transport to fund an upgrade to the diesel extraction fans at the underground station, but KiwiRail decided it would be more cost-efficient to cease serving Britomart and move the Northern Explorer terminus to The Strand instead.

Current use
The Strand is occasionally used for excursion trains and is also available as a backup station for Britomart in case of disruptions. Since electrification, part of the station has been used as a stabling facility. Platform 8 restaurant occupies the foyer of the 1930 station.

Te Huia extends to The Strand on Saturdays from 24 July 2021. It was extended to The Strand on weekdays from 24 January 2022, much earlier than an earlier 2024 proposal, contingent on the Third Main Line project being sufficiently advanced. It may also run on Sundays and public holidays after year 4 or 5; once track access in the Auckland area is not required on Sundays for key rail projects.

Future

Ngāti Whātua Ōrākei, the local iwi who owns much of the land in the area of the station, states on their masterplan for the area the wish for the station to be renamed Te Tōangaroa, the traditional name of Mechanics Bay, the reclaimed bay in which the station is located.

Proposals have also involved or inferred the return of suburban trains to The Strand, though this would entail moving the station further east or building new platforms on the tracks between Quay Park Junction and Britomart. In this case Eastern Line trains would call at The Strand/Te Tōangaroa station.

See also
 List of Auckland railway stations
Britomart Transport Centre

References

External links

 Auckland's new Railway Station (1927 article in NZR magazine)

Photographs of Auckland Railway Station held in Auckland Libraries' heritage collections.
1928 photo of Breakwater Rd goods shed about to open.

Rail transport in Auckland
Buildings and structures in Auckland
Railway stations in New Zealand
Heritage New Zealand Category 1 historic places in the Auckland Region
Railway stations opened in 1930
Railway stations closed in 2003
Gummer and Ford buildings and structures
1930s architecture in New Zealand
Auckland CBD
Parnell, New Zealand